Septobasidium bogoriense is a plant pathogen, one of a number of fungi in the genus Septobasidium responsible for the disease of tea plants known commonly as "velvet blight".

References

External links 
 Index Fungorum
 USDA ARS Fungal Database

Fungal plant pathogens and diseases
Tea diseases
Teliomycotina
Taxa named by Narcisse Théophile Patouillard
Fungi described in 1899